Oxygen-18 (Ω) is a natural, stable isotope of oxygen and one of the environmental isotopes.

 is an important precursor for the production of fluorodeoxyglucose (FDG) used in positron emission tomography (PET). Generally, in the radiopharmaceutical industry, enriched water is bombarded with hydrogen ions in either a cyclotron or linear accelerator, producing fluorine-18. This is then synthesized into FDG and injected into a patient. This compound has a density almost 30% greater than that of natural water.

The accurate measurements of  rely on proper procedures of analysis, sample preparation and storage.

Paleoclimatology
Assuming that atmospheric circulation and elevation has not changed significantly over the poles, the temperature of ice formation can be calculated as equilibrium fractionation between phases of water that is known for different temperatures. In the 1950s, Harold Urey performed an experiment in which he mixed both normal water and water with oxygen-18 in a barrel, and then partially froze the barrel's contents.

The ratio / (δ) can also be used to determine paleothermometry in certain types of fossils. The fossils in question have to show progressive growth in the animal or plant that the fossil represents. The fossil material used is generally calcite or aragonite, however oxygen isotope paleothermometry has also been done of phosphatic fossils using SHRIMP. For example, seasonal temperature variations may be determined from a single sea shell from a scallop. As the scallop grows, an extension is seen on the surface of the shell. Each growth band can be measured, and a calculation is used to determine the probable sea water temperature in comparison to each growth. The equation for this is:

Where T is temperature in Celsius and A and B are constants.

For determination of ocean temperatures over geologic time, multiple fossils of the same species in different stratigraphic layers would be measured, and the difference between them would indicate long term changes.

Plant physiology

In the study of plants' photorespiration, the labeling of atmosphere by oxygen-18 allows us to measure the oxygen uptake by the photorespiration pathway. Labeling by  gives the unidirectional flux of  uptake, while there is a net photosynthetic  evolution. It was demonstrated that, under preindustrial atmosphere, most plants reabsorb, by photorespiration, half of the oxygen produced by photosynthesis. Then, the yield of photosynthesis was halved by the presence of oxygen in atmosphere.

18F production
Fluorine-18 is usually produced by irradiation of 18O-enriched water (H218O) with high-energy (about 18 MeV) protons prepared in a cyclotron or a linear accelerator, yielding an aqueous solution of 18F fluoride. This solution is then used for rapid synthesis of a labeled molecule, often with the fluorine atom replacing a hydroxyl group. The labeled molecules or radiopharmaceuticals have to be synthesized after the radiofluorine is prepared, as the high energy proton radiation would destroy the molecules.

Large amounts of oxygen-18 enriched water are used in positron emission tomography centers, for on-site production of 18F-labeled fludeoxyglucose (FDG).

An example of the production cycle is a 90-minute irradiation of 2 milliliters of 18O-enriched water in a titanium cell, through a 25 μm thick window made of Havar (a cobalt alloy) foil, with a proton beam having an energy of 17.5 MeV and a beam current of 30 microamperes.

The irradiated water has to be purified before another irradiation, to remove organic contaminants, traces of tritium produced by a 18O(p,t)16O reaction, and ions leached from the target cell and sputtered from the Havar foil.

See also
 Willi Dansgaard – a paleoclimatologist
 Isotopes of oxygen
 Paleothermometry
 Pâté de Foie Gras (short story)
 Δ18O
Global meteoric water line

References

Environmental isotopes
Isotopes of oxygen